Plerng Prang Tian (lit. 'the fire obscures the candle') is a 2019 Thai lakorn. The lakorn is based on a novel written by หัสวีร์. It was directed by วรวิทย์ ศรีสุภาพ and produced by Good Feeling. It starred , Nuttanicha Dungwattanawanich, Nattasha Bunprachom, and Nawasch Phupantachsee. It was aired on Channel 3.

Synopsis
The film tells the love story of Tiankhum (Nuttanicha Dungwattanawanich), an innocent girl who falls in love with Prince Taywarit, a playboy and husband to Princess Wongduen (Nattasha Bunprachom).

In the present, Kalin is a famous model who got herself caught in a scandal. Kalin receives a mystery golden hairpin that takes her back to the past as Tiankhum to get her revenge.

Cast

Main
 as In Wiangraming (Present) / Prince Taywarit (Past)
Nuttanicha Dungwattanawanich as Kalin Raweerampa (Present) / Kaew / Tiankhum (Past)
Supapat Phoncharoenrat as Kalin (Young) / Tiankhum (Young)
Nattasha Bunprachom as Patima (Present) / Princess Wongduen (Past)
Nawasch Phupantachsee as Benjamin Henry (Present) / Louis (Past)

Supporting
Maneerat Sricharoon as Saiparn (Present) / Ounhuan (Past)
Nisachon Tuamsoongnuen as Pam (Present) / Paika (Past)
Chanon Rikulsurakan as Nao
New Narissan 
Kin Karun Aramsri as Max
Sutthatip Wutichaipradit as Pangrum
Chamaiporn Jaturaput as Dutsadee (Present) / Lady Choreuang (Past)
 as Tharnthong (Present) / Khampor (Past)
 as Lord Wiangsawan (Past)
Thanayong Wongtrakul as Nankaew
Natha Lloyd as Soisangwan
Jack Chakapan as Kampaeng
Lorena Schuett as Nim (Nao's girlfriend)
Thongthong Mokjok as Meesua

Guests
 as Kalin's father
Jirawat Wachirasarunpat as Noiphutthawong
Oliver Pupart as Peter Henry (Benjamin's father)
Chanokwanun Rakcheep as Hathai (Benjamin's mother)
Surasak Chaiat as Suang (In's father)
 as Kalin's stepmom
 as Pongsri (Patima's mother)
 as Kanomkluay's mother
 as Psychic

Ratings
In this table,  represent the lowest ratings and  represent the highest ratings.

Original Soundtrack

Reception
After airing the first and second episodes, the lakorn received great feedback. The hashtag of the lakorn trended at first place on Twitter in Thailand with the first two episodes. Nuttanicha Dungwattanawanich was praised by the audience although it was the first time she played this kind of character.

In March 2020 that Plerng Prang Tian was released on Netflix Thailand.

References

External links
 Ch3 Thailand Official Website 
 Ch3 Thailand Official YouTube

2010s Thai television series
Thai drama television series
2019 Thai television series debuts
2019 Thai television series endings
Thai historical television series
Thai romance television series
Thai television soap operas
Channel 3 (Thailand) original programming